The 2016 Pac-12 Conference women's basketball tournament was the postseason women's basketball tournament at KeyArena in Seattle, Washington from March 3–6, 2016. Oregon State defeated UCLA in the championship game to win their first Pac-12 Women's Tournament title in school history. With that win Oregon State received an automatic bid to the NCAA women's tournament.

Seeds
Teams were seeded by conference record, with ties broken in the following order:
 Record between the tied teams
 Record against the highest-seeded team not involved in the tie, going down through the seedings as necessary
 Higher RPI

Schedule

Thursday-Sunday, March 3–6, 2016

The top four seeds received a first-round bye.

Bracket

All-Tournament Team
Source:

Most Outstanding Player

Notes
 March 4, 2016 – Head coach Niya Butts coached her last game for the University of Arizona

See also
2016 Pac-12 Conference men's basketball tournament

References

2015–16 Pac-12 Conference women's basketball season
2016 in sports in Washington (state)
Basketball competitions in Seattle
2016 in Seattle
Women's sports in Washington (state)
College basketball tournaments in Washington (state)